Aris Lykogiannis (Greek: Άρης Λυκογιάννης; born 10 April 1969) is a Greek professional basketball coach, most recently managing PAOK of the Greek Basket League.

Coaching career
He coached Ikaros Kallitheas from 2009 to 2012. With Ikaros, Lykogiannis won the Greek 2nd Division championship in 2010. He was the coach of Kolossos Rodou of the Greek League from 2014 to 2018. During that time, he also became for a short period of time the assistant coach for Panathinaikos in 2015.

In 2018, he became the head coach of the newly promoted to the Greek Basket League club Holargos. He returned once more to Kolossos Rodou for the 2019–2020 season, but parted ways with them on 3 August 2020.

On 10 December 2020 Lykogiannis was appointed as the new head coach of PAOK.

Awards and accomplishments

As a head coach

Pro clubs
Greek 2nd Division champion: (2010)

References

External links
 Aris Lykogiannis at eurobasket.com

1969 births
Living people
Greek basketball coaches
Holargos B.C. coaches
Ikaros B.C. coaches
Kolossos Rodou B.C. coaches
Pagrati B.C. coaches
P.A.O.K. BC coaches
Sporting B.C. coaches
Sportspeople from Athens
Solna Vikings coaches